Aguasay is one of the 13 municipalities of the state of Monagas, Venezuela.

History 
In 1987, it is elevated to Municipality within the old Maturín District On September 27, 1994, it is separated from the Municipality of Maturín creating the Autonomous Municipality of Aguasay.

Geography 

It is located to the west of the Monagas State, bordered to the north by the municipalities of Ezequiel Zamora and Santa Bárbara.

The landscape is predominantly flat table, while it presents a tropical dry forest vegetation with an annual average temperature of 25.4°C and an average annual precipitation of 1,055 mm.

Economy 
The oil exploitation in the municipality is relevant.

Culture 
The town is famous for its fabric that is made from a plant that is grown in that town called Curagua.

Cuisine 
A sweet that has stood out in Aguasay is the Moriche Ice Cream.

Politics and government

Mayors 
 José Galindo PSUV

References

Municipalities of Monagas